Albertville is a municipality in the Canadian province of Quebec, located in La Matapédia Regional County Municipality.

The municipality, named after André-Albert Blais, 2nd bishop of Rimouski, had a population of 239 in the Canada 2021 Census.

Geography
Albertville is in one of the highest territories of the Matapédia Valley.

Demographics

Population

Canada Census data before 2001:
 Population in 1996: 364 (-9.0% from 1991)
 Population in 1991: 400

Municipal council
 Mayor: Martin Landry
 Councillors: Edes Berger, Géraldine Chrétien, Charline Chabot, Gilles Demeules, Roger Durette, Gilberte Potvin

See also
 List of municipalities in Quebec

References

Municipalities in Quebec
Incorporated places in Bas-Saint-Laurent
La Matapédia Regional County Municipality